The green-capped tanager (Stilpnia meyerdeschauenseei) is a species of bird in the family Thraupidae. It is endemic to forest edge and gardens at altitudes of 1450–2200 m. in Puno, Peru, and La Paz, Bolivia. It is fairly common and possibly spreading, but its small population has led to it being evaluated as Near Threatened by BirdLife International and IUCN. It closely resembles the widespread burnished-buff tanager (S. cayana), but its mantle is bluer (male) or greener (female), and its crown is greenish-buff. Its specific name commemorates the ornithologist Rodolphe Meyer de Schauensee.

References

green-capped tanager
Birds of the Yungas
green-capped tanager
Taxonomy articles created by Polbot
Taxobox binomials not recognized by IUCN